Chhathar is a rural municipality (gaunpalika) out of four rural municipality located in Tehrathum District of Province No. 1 of Nepal. There are a total of 6 municipalities in Tehrathum in which 2 are urban and 4 are rural.

Sudap, Okhare, Phakchamara, Panchakanya Pokhari Hamarjung and Angdim which previously were all separate Village development committee merged to form this new local level body. Fulfilling the requirement of the new Constitution of Nepal 2015, Ministry of Federal Affairs and Local Development replaced all old VDCs and Municipalities into 753 new local level body (Municipality).

The rural municipality is divided into total 6 wards and the headquarter of this newly formed rural municipality is situated in Hamarjung.

References

External links
 Official website
 Final District 1-75 Corrected Last for RAJPATRA

Rural municipalities in Koshi Province
Populated places in Tehrathum District
Rural municipalities of Nepal established in 2017
Rural municipalities in Tehrathum District